The Swedish Seed Testing and Certification Institute was a Swedish government agency that answered to the Ministry of Agriculture, Food and Consumer Affairs. The agency was the official authority in Sweden for controlling the quality of seeds used in agriculture. It was located in Svalöv. On January 1, 2006 it was made a part of the Swedish National Board of Agriculture and is thus no longer an independent agency.

See also
Government agencies in Sweden.

External links
Swedish Seed Testing and Certification Institute - Official site

Seed Testing and Certification Institute
Agricultural organizations based in Sweden
Scientific organizations based in Sweden